On 16 December 2016, several dozen heavily armed gunmen attacked an army outpost in Nassoumbou, Soum Province, Burkina Faso, about 30 kilometres (18.6 M) from the border with Mali, leaving at least 12 soldiers dead and 2 others missing. The attack, carried out by about 40 unidentified gunmen riding in pickup trucks and armed with AK-47s and rocket-propelled grenades, was directed at an army base which was significantly damaged in the assault. The soldiers killed were members of an elite army counterterrorism unit. Billed as "murderous" by President Roch Marc Christian Kaboré, this was the second direct attack against the Burkina army since jihadist assailants surfaced in the country in early 2015.

See also
List of terrorist incidents in 2016

References 

 
2016 mass shootings in Africa
2016 murders in Burkina Faso
21st-century mass murder in Burkina Faso
Attacks on military installations in the 2010s
December 2016 crimes in Africa
Islamic terrorism in Burkina Faso
Islamic terrorist incidents in 2016
Mass murder in 2016
Mass shootings in Burkina Faso
Massacres in Burkina Faso
Soum Province
Terrorist incidents attributed to al-Qaeda in the Islamic Maghreb
Terrorist incidents in Burkina Faso in 2016
Jihadist insurgency in Burkina Faso